Mark Purdon is a driver and trainer of standardbred racehorses in New Zealand. He was associated with many champions and is one of the leading trainers and drivers of harness horses in New Zealand and Australasia. He was inducted into the Inter Dominion Hall of Fame.

Mark has trained on his own account and in partnership as follows:
 2014 to 31/12/2020 - with Natalie Rasmussen
 2013 – sole
 2008–2012 with Grant Payne 
 1998–2007 sole

In mid November 2020, Mark Purdon and Natalie Rasmussen announced they would cease their training partnership as from 31 December 2020. They would lease their Rolleston stables to Hayden and Amanda Cullen and although staying involved, when required, they would not be managing the day to day training operation. Mark (aged 56 years old) and Natalie (43) intended to take a break after working with horses for a combined 70 years.

Their last night as a partnership was the December 2020 Auckland Pacing Cup meeting at Alexandra Park in which they managed to quinella the Cup with Amazing Dream and Spankem.

From 1 October 2021 Purdon officially returned to the formal training ranks again and joined Hayden Cullen in partnership.  It was also announced Natalie Rasmussen will then re-join him in fulltime training from 1 January 2022, replacing Cullen who would revert to being stable foreman again.

Notable horses

Top horses Mark has been associated with, and races they have won, include:

 Adore Me: 2014 New Zealand Trotting Cup
 Akuta: 2022 New Zealand Trotting Derby
 Amazing Dream: 2020 Auckland Pacing Cup
 Auckland Reactor: 2009 Auckland Trotting Cup
 Cruz Bromac: 2019 New Zealand Trotting Cup
 Don't Stop Dreaming: 2022 The Crossing Ace of Spades (2YO Colts & Geldings) Mobile Pace
 Dream About Me: 2016 Auckland Trotting Cup
 High Energy: 2022 Canterbury Spa & Pool Ace of Hearts (2YO fillies) Mobile Trot
 I Can Doosit (trotter): 2011 & 2012 Inter Dominion Trotting Championship, 2011 & 2012 Rowe Cup, 2012 Dominion Handicap
 Il Vicolo: 1995 & 1996 New Zealand Trotting Cup
 Jack Cade: 2003 New Zealand Free For All
 Lazarus: 2016 & 2017 New Zealand Trotting Cup, 2017 Inter Dominion Pacing Championship
 Millwood Nike: 2022 Avon City Ford Ace of Diamonds (2YO Fillies) Mobile Pace 
 No Matter Wat: 2022 New Zealand Oaks
 Pride Of Petite (trotter): 1996 & 1997 Inter Dominion Trotting Championship
 Self Assured: 2019 Auckland Pacing Cup, 2020 New Zealand Trotting Cup, 2022 New Zealand Free For All
 Smolda: 2016 Inter Dominion Pacing Championship
 Spankem: 2020 New Zealand Free For All, Miracle Mile Pace, 2nd in 2019 & 2020 New Zealand Trotting Cup and 2020 Auckland Pacing Cup
 Thefixer: 2018 New Zealand Trotting Cup
 Turn It Up: 2018 Auckland Pacing Cup
 Ultimate Sniper: 2019 Inter Dominion Pacing Championship
 Winterfell (trotter): 2019 Inter Dominion Trotting Championship
 Young Rufus: 2002 Auckland Pacing Cup

See also
 Harness racing in New Zealand

References 

Inter Dominion winners
Living people
New Zealand harness racers
New Zealand racehorse trainers
New Zealand Trotting Cup winners
Year of birth missing (living people)